XXV is the twelfth album from the German rock band Oomph!.

Track listing

Music videos 
 Alles aus Liebe (31 July 2015)

Charts

References

Oomph! albums
2015 albums
German-language albums